Jay McMullen (June 28, 1920 – March 18, 1992) was an American journalist. McMullen graduated from Northwestern University. He was a Chicago City Hall reporter for the Chicago Daily News for nearly quarter of a century. He also worked as a real estate writer for the Chicago Sun-Times for many years. From 1978 until his death 14 years later, McMullen was married to politician Jane Byrne. Byrne served as the Mayor of Chicago from 1979 to 1983, and McMullen was a close advisor to his wife during those years. He also served as her Press Secretary during her first year in office. He died of cancer at the age of 71 in Chicago in 1992.

References

1920 births
1992 deaths
People from Cicero, Illinois
Northwestern University alumni
Journalists from Illinois
Chicago Daily News people
First ladies and gentlemen of Chicago
20th-century American writers
20th-century American journalists
American male journalists